The 1982 Boston University Terriers football team was an American football team that represented Boston University as a member of the Yankee Conference during the 1982 NCAA Division I-AA football season. In their sixth season under head coach Rick Taylor, the Terriers compiled a 5–6 record (3–2 against conference opponents), finished in a four-way tie for the Yankee Conference championship, lost to Colgate in the first round of the NCAA Division I-AA Football Championship playoffs, and outscored opponents by a total of 250 to 223.

Schedule

References

Boston University
Boston University Terriers football seasons
Yankee Conference football champion seasons
Boston University Terriers football